Martín Fierro is the national poem of Argentina, and the leading character of that poem. 

Martín Fierro may also refer to:

 Martín Fierro (magazine), Argentine literary magazine, 1924–1927
 Martín Fierro, alternate name for Florida group, literary group, linked to the magazine
 Martín Fierro (1904–05 magazine), lesser-known Argentine anarchist magazine
 Martín Fierro (film), 1968 film
 La Vuelta de Martín Fierro, 1974 Argentine film
 Martín Fierro Awards, awards for Argentine radio and television
 Martin Fierro (saxophonist) (1942–2008), saxophone player